The 1957 Montana State Bobcats football team was an American football team that represented Montana State University as an independent during the 1957 NCAA College Division football season. In its fifth and final season under head coach Tony Storti, the team compiled an 8–2 record. The team won 16 games without a loss during the 1956 and 1957 seasons before losing to Idaho State on October 19.

Schedule

References

Montana State
Montana State Bobcats football seasons
Montana State Bobcats football